The flame-breasted fruit dove (Ptilinopus marchei) is a species of bird in the family Columbidae. It is endemic to the Philippines only being found in the mountains of Luzon.This is a large dove reaching 42 cm long, being the largest fruit dove in the country and rivalling the size of Imperial pigeons. It is identified with its red hood, black wings with a red patch on its secondaries and its unmistakable flame-coloured breast.  Its natural habitats are in upper areas of the tropical moist lowland forest and in mid to upper montane forest.  It is threatened by habitat loss, poaching for the pet trade and hunting for food.

It is illegal to hunt, capture or keep flame-breasted fruit-doves under Philippine Law RA 9147.

Description 
It is described on EBird as "A fairly large dove. Pale gray from the belly to the sides of the chest and neck, with a sooty back and cheek, an orange chest patch with dark red below, and a pink crown and mark across the flight feathers. Similar to the Yellow-breasted Fruit-Dove, but Flame-breasted has an orange rather than yellow chest and a dark pink crown. Song is a deep, rising-then-falling “oo-woo.” Takes flight with loud wing claps."

Habitat and Conservation Status 
It is known in lowland and hill dipterocarp forest and mid-montane forest from 450-1,500 m with some sparse records in montane mossy forests. It  is only found in primary forest being fairly sensitive and unable to thrive in secondary forest.

This is now listed vulnerable with 2,500 to 9,999 mature individuals left in the wild. It is threatened by habitat loss, poaching for the pet trade, nest disturbance and hunting for food. They have been seen being sold in illegal online markets on Facebook. Habitat loss  is its main threat habitat loss with wholesale clearance of forest habitats as a result of logging, agricultural conversion and mining activities occurring within the range. Forest cover in the Sierra Madre  has declined by 83% since the 1930s and most remaining areas are under logging concessions and may suffer further from major road-building plans. Mount Banahaw is affected land conversion due to quarrying and development for tourism.

It occurs in several protected areas but more must be done to protect these areas from poachers and loggers. The  International Union for Conservation of Nature recommends more surveys be done to know the full extent of this bird and to make key habitats on Mt. Cetaceo (Cagayan Valley), Infanta, Quezon and Mount Polis as formally protected areas and to promote stricter enforcement of laws designed to stop hunting and trade.

Under the Philippine law RA9147, it is completely illegal to hunt these birds or to capture and keep them as pets. As it is Vulnerable species, any violations have harsher punishments including "(c) imprisonment of six (6) months and one (1) day to one (1) year and/or a fine of One thousand pesos (P1,000.00) to One hundred thousand pesos (P100,000.00), if inflicted or undertaken against vulnerable species"

References

External links
BirdLife Species Factsheet.

flame-breasted fruit dove
Birds of Luzon
flame-breasted fruit dove
Taxonomy articles created by Polbot
Taxobox binomials not recognized by IUCN